Matías Nicolás Coselli (born 27 February 1990) is an Argentine professional footballer who plays as a forward for Argentino.

Career
Coselli's career started with Deportivo Laferrere, having joined from San Lorenzo in 2002. He featured in the Primera C Metropolitana team's seniors for six years from 2008, making seventeen appearances for the club. During his time with the Greater Buenos Aires outfit, Coselli was loaned out on two occasions - to Primera D Metropolitana duo Centro Español and Lugano, netting six and nine goals respectively. In 2014, Coselli moved to fellow fifth tier team Central Ballester. Eight appearances followed. 2015 saw Coselli join Deportivo Paraguayo. His stay lasted three seasons, as he scored fifteen in fifty.

On 30 June 2017, Coselli agreed terms with Victoriano Arenas. Nineteen goals arrived in his opening campaign, as they won promotion as champions to Primera C Metropolitana in 2017–18. He followed that up with twelve further goals in tier four, which led to Coselli's departure to Primera B Metropolitana's Deportivo Español in January 2019. He made his debut on 1 February during a goalless draw against Tristán Suárez, with the forward appearing seven more times without netting in a season that concluded with relegation. Coselli joined Argentino in July 2019, scoring ten times in 2019–20.

Career statistics
.

Honours
Victoriano Arenas
Primera D Metropolitana: 2017–18

Individual
Primera D Metropolitana Top Goalscorer: 2017–18

References

External links

1990 births
Living people
People from La Matanza Partido
Argentine footballers
Association football forwards
Primera C Metropolitana players
Primera D Metropolitana players
Primera B Metropolitana players
Deportivo Laferrere footballers
Centro Social y Recreativo Español players
Club Atlético Lugano players
Central Ballester players
Deportivo Paraguayo footballers
Victoriano Arenas players
Deportivo Español footballers
Argentino de Merlo footballers
Sportspeople from Buenos Aires Province